Nigeria is scheduled to compete at the 2024 Summer Olympics in Paris from 26 July to 11 August 2024. Since the nation made its debut in Helsinki 1952, Nigerian athletes have appeared in every edition of the Summer Olympic Games, except for Montreal 1976 as part of the Congolese-led boycott.

Competitors
The following is the list of number of competitors in the Games.

Cycling

Road
Nigeria entered one rider to compete in the women's road race by finishing in the top two at the 2023 African Championships in Accra, Ghana.

References

External links

Nations at the 2024 Summer Olympics
2024
2024 in Nigerian sport